Roberto Jorge Canessa Urta, M.D., (born 17 January 1953) is one of the 16 survivors of the Uruguayan Air Force Flight 571, which crashed in the Andes mountains on 13 October 1972, and a Uruguayan political figure. He was portrayed by Josh Hamilton in the 1993 feature film, Alive.

13 October 1972 air crash
At the time of the accident, Canessa was a 19-year-old medical student. His fiancée was Laura Surraco, the daughter of a doctor. He graduated from the Stella Maris College (Montevideo) and played for their alumni rugby team, Old Christians Club.  Between 1971 and 1979, he played eight matches with the Uruguay national rugby union team, and was also selected in 1980, for the South American Jaguars tour of South Africa.

It was Canessa who suggested to his fellow survivors that in order to stay alive, they should eat the flesh of the deceased victims of the crash. Together with Fernando Parrado, he spent 10 days trekking through the Andes in search of help for the survivors.

Post rescue
After the rescue, Canessa recounted how his drive to escape from the mountains was fueled by the thought of his mother and his girlfriend. He later married Laura Surraco, and they had two sons and a daughter. He works as a pediatric cardiologist and motivational speaker.

Candidate for President of Uruguay

Canessa was a candidate in the 1994 Uruguayan presidential elections but he failed to gain public support. Canessa obtained only 0.08%  of the vote, lagging far behind former President, Julio María Sanguinetti, whose party returned to power with 30.83% of the public vote.

Public appearance in 2016 

During an interview made at CNN en Español, Canessa expressed that he wanted to help the survivors of the tragedy of Chapecoense in Medellín, Colombia.

See also
 Uruguayan Air Force Flight 571
 Nando Parrado 
 Carlos Páez Rodríguez
 Old Christians Club
 Alive: 20 Years Later
 Alive: Miracle in The Andes

References

1953 births
Living people
Rugby union players from Montevideo
Survivors of aviation accidents or incidents
Uruguayan Air Force Flight 571
Uruguayan Roman Catholics
Uruguayan people of Italian descent
Candidates for President of Uruguay
Uruguayan cardiac surgeons
Uruguayan rugby union players
Uruguayan autobiographers
People educated at Stella Maris College (Montevideo)